The 2005 Asian Men’s Club Volleyball Championship was the 6th staging of the AVC Club Championships. The tournament was held in Liaqut Gymnasium, Islamabad, Pakistan. Rahat CSKA of Kazakhstan won the tournament in round robin format.

Results

|}

|}

Final standing

References
Asian Volleyball Confederation

A
V
V